KK Cibona history and statistics in FIBA Europe and Euroleague Basketball (company) competitions.

European competitions

Worldwide competitions

Record
KK Cibona has overall, from 1969–70 (first participation) to 2015–16 (last participation): 271 wins against 263 defeats plus 1 draws in 535 games for all the European club competitions.

 EuroLeague: 181–200 (381)
 FIBA Saporta Cup: 38–18 plus 1 draw (56) /// EuroCup Basketball: 1–21 (22)
 FIBA Korać Cup: 42–17 (59) /// FIBA Europe Cup: 10–7 (17)

Also KK Cibona has a 12–4 record in the FIBA Intercontinental Cup.

See also
 Yugoslav basketball clubs in European competitions

External links
FIBA Europe
EuroLeague
ULEB
EuroCup

 
Cibona